Leontia Flynn (born December 1974) is a poet and writer from Northern Ireland. She grew up between the towns of Dundrum and Newcastle, County Down, Northern Ireland. She is the second-youngest of five siblings.  She has worked at The Seamus Heaney Centre for Poetry at Queen's University Belfast since 2005.

Life and work
These Days, a first collection of poems, was published by Jonathan Cape in 2004, followed by Drives (Jonathan Cape) in 2008. Profit and Loss (written during pregnancy and the early infancy of her daughter). was published in 2011.  A fourth collection of poems, The Radio, was published by Jonathan Cape in 2017 and Wake Forest University Press in 2018. Flynn also published a monograph about trying to make sense of fellow Northern Irish poet Medbh McGuckian's poetry in light of feminist and post-structuralist theory in 2014.

Prizes
These Days won an Eric Gregory Award in manuscript in 2001, the Forward Prize for Best first collection in 2004 and was shortlisted for the Costa Prize. 

In the same year Flynn was named one of twenty ‘Next Generation poets’ by the Poetry Book Society. Flynn received The Rooney Prize for Irish Literature, in 2008. Profit and Loss was Poetry Book Society choice for Autumn 2013 and  shortlisted for the TS Eliot Prize. Flynn won the Lawrence O’Shaughnessy Prize for Irish Literature in 2011, and the prestigious Ireland Fund's AWB Vincent Literary Award in 2014. The Radio was shortlisted for the TS Eliot Prize and won the Irish Times's Poetry Now award.

Critical reception
Flynn's work has been favourably reviewed by writers and critics. The Costa judges wrote "a breathtakingly accomplished debut, These Days transforms Flynn's every day experiences into literary jewels.  She has exceptional insight and the writerly rigour of a poet many years her senior." Tom Paulin wrote "smart as a whip, lyrical, always on point, Leontia Flynn's poems are the real, right thing."

Of Drives, Adam Philips wrote. "Exact and casual and formally adept, a bit like an Irish (and female) Frank O'Hara, and not a bit like anyone else" (Guardian: Books of the Year). Frances Leviston wrote "Mercifully, these poems are not 'about' peace treaties, or carbon-consciousness, but about the act of apprehension itself: how one navigates through culture, language, history, expectation, with both a brain and a sense of humour ... Such currents of difficult feeling, behind the wise, glittering fronts of her poems, make them all the more remarkable."

In Poetry Review, Sarah Wardle called 'Profit and Loss', "[a]n outstanding Audenesque long poem ... [which] makes this book essential reading, as it brilliantly captures the zeitgeist...'" Bernard O'Donoghue wrote in TLS Books of the Year, "My favourite book was Profit and Loss by Leontia Flynn (Cape), demonstrating her unrivalled capacity as a good-humoured but devastating observer of the modern secular scene. 'Letter to Friends', Flynn's long poem about the way we live now, is a masterpiece.". 

In The Irish Times, Philip Coleman posited that Flynn's place as one of the strongest and most skillful poetic voices of her generation, Reviewing 'Profit and Loss', Coleman writes that "Like Auden, she addresses important issues here in a language that is both playful and serious, and in a form that is, if not 'large enough to swim in', at least robust enough to contain the many concerns she raises in it, from the delights and torments of personal and familial memory to the function and value of poetry in (postmodern) society."

Themes and influences
Flynn has written about as family and psychological inheritance, as well as about her father's Alzheimer's disease. Her poems also sometimes address technology.  She has described the sonnets in Drives as ‘wikipedia poems’. Profit and Loss contains a poem about a floppy disk, and ‘Letter to Friends’ contains lines about the rise of social media:But this is our life, half virtual, half flesh:the instant message and the feedback loop:the tailored advertisement made afreshwith each mouse-click – the generally crapfactoids and news-lite that we read online...(... and yet... and yet a mob'sno less a mob well fed and disciplined,as Eliot wrote, but that's a different story).

Personal life
Leontia Flynn is separated and lives in Belfast, with her daughter.

See also
Factotum (arts organisation)

Bibliography
 These Days Jonathan Cape 2004; .
 Drives Jonathan Cape 2008; .
 Profit and Loss Jonathan Cape 2011; 
 The Radio Jonathan Cape 2017;

References

External links
 Official website
 British Council profile

Living people
1974 births
20th-century Irish people
21st-century Irish people
Alumni of the University of Edinburgh
Alumni of Queen's University Belfast
People from County Down
Women poets from Northern Ireland
Date of birth missing (living people)